CBN, or cbn, may refer to:

Broadcasting organizations
 Radio stations in St. John's, Newfoundland:
 CBN (AM), CBC Radio One
 CBN-FM, CBC Music
 Chronicle Broadcasting Network, the predecessor of ABS-CBN
 CBN (Australian TV station), a TV station in southern New South Wales, Australia
 Central Brasileira de Notícias, a Brazilian radio network
 Christian Broadcasting Network, United States
 Caribbean Broadcast Network, British Virgin Islands
 Commonwealth Broadcasting Network, Canada

Other organizations
 Central Bank of Nigeria
 Canadian Bank Note Company, security printers
 China Business Network, Chinese media company
 Colorado Badged Network, a Colorado cannabis industry organization
 Compal Broadband Networks, a brand of Compal Electronics

Academic and education
Convent Bukit Nanas, a Malaysian all-girls school

Persons
 N. Chandrababu Naidu (born 1950), Indian politician

Science, technology, and medicine
 Chemical, biological, or nuclear (warfare or defence): types of weapon of mass destruction
 Related terms: NRBC (nuclear, radiological, biological, and chemical); CBRN (chemical, biological, radiological, and nuclear); NBC (nuclear, biological, and chemical)
 Cannabinol, a non-psychoactive cannabinoid from the Cannabis plant
 Cubic boron nitride, a high-hardness material useful for abrasive cutting and for coatings for machine parts
 Certified Bariatric Nurse, one of many nursing credentials and certifications

Transportation
 CBN, the IATA code for Penggung Airport, West Java, Indonesia
 CBN, the MTR code for Causeway Bay North station, Hong Kong
 CBN, the National Rail code for Camborne railway station, Cornwall, UK

See also